Greenwood Memorial Park is a cemetery in the northwest United States, located in Renton, Washington, a suburb southeast of Seattle. It is notable as  the resting place of rock guitarist Jimi Hendrix (1942–1970), a Seattle native; over 14,000 fans visit his memorial annually.

Also interred at Greenwood are professional football players Clancy Williams (1942–1986) and Nesby Glasgow (1957–2020).

References

External links 

Find a Grave

Cemeteries in Washington (state)
Renton, Washington
Protected areas of King County, Washington